The Oath of the Ancestors (French: Le Serment des ancêtres) is an 1822 painting by the Guadeloupe-born French artist Guillaume Guillon-Lethière depicting the summit meeting between the leader of Haiti, Alexandre Pétion, and General Jean-Jacques Dessalines (later Jacques I Emperor of Haiti), lieutenant of Toussaint Louverture.  It was at that confluence when the two revolutionary leaders made a decisive pact to defeat the French colonial forces and achieve independence.

Considered a national treasure it was painted as a tribute and gifted to the people of Haiti.  The work is considered not only his gift to the nascent nation of Haiti but also a testament to Guillon-Lethière's dedication to their revolution against slavery. 
The painting was lost for quite sometime but was rediscovered in 1991 in the Cathedral of Our Lady of the Assumption in Port-au-Prince. In 1998 it was sent back to France to be restored and then presented at the Louvre before making the return trip to Haiti.
After its return to Haiti it was displayed in the Presidential Palace which was largely destroyed in the devastating 2010 earthquake as was the aforementioned cathedral.  It was then reported that the painting's stretcher was destroyed and the canvas was torn but could be repaired. 
It was next entrusted to the Centre de recherche et de restauration des musées de France to be rehabilitated, though this time while remaining in Haiti.

This is the only painting where Guillon-Lethière added "né à la Guadeloupe" to his signature.

References

1822 paintings
Paintings by Guillaume Guillon-Lethière
History paintings
Haitian art